δ-Decalactone (DDL) is a chemical compound, classified as a lactone, that naturally occurs in fruit and milk products in traces. It can be obtained from both chemical and biological sources. Chemically, it is produced from Baeyer–Villiger oxidation of delfone. From biomass, it can be produced via the hydrogenation of 6-amyl-α-pyrone. DDL has applications in food, polymer, and agricultural industries to formulate important products.

The S-enantiomer smells good. The R-enantiomer is the main component of the warning stench of the North American porcupine.

See also
 γ-Decalactone

References 

Delta-lactones